In weight training, a kettlebell is a cast-iron or cast-steel ball with a handle attached to the top (resembling a cannonball with a handle). It is used to perform many types of exercises, including   ballistic exercises that combine  cardiovascular, strength and  flexibility training.
Kettlebells are the primary equipment used in the weight-lifting sport of kettlebell lifting.

History

The Russian girya (plural  ) was a type of metal weight, primarily used to weigh crops in the 18th century. 
The use of such weights by circus strongmen is recorded for the 19th century. They began to be used for recreational and competition strength athletics in Russia and Europe in the late 19th century. The birth of competitive kettlebell lifting or girevoy sport (гиревой спорт) is dated to 1885, with the founding of the "Circle for Amateur Athletics" (Кружок любителей атлетики).
The English term kettle bell has been in use since the early 20th century.

Similar weights used in Classical Greece were the haltere, comparable to the modern kettlebell in terms of movements.

Shape

Unlike traditional dumbbells, a kettlebell's center of mass is extended beyond the hand, similar to Indian clubs or ishi sashi. This facilitates ballistic and swinging movements. Variants of the kettlebell include bags filled with sand, water, or steel shot. The kettlebell allows for swing movements and release moves with added safety and added grip, wrist, arm and core strengthening. The weight of a kettlebell is not distributed evenly. Thus, the unique shape of a kettlebell provides the "unstable force" for handling - key for the effectiveness of the kettlebell exercises.

The parts of the kettlebell can be broken down into: handle, corners, horns, window, bell, and base.

Usage
By their nature, typical kettlebell exercises build strength and endurance, particularly in the lower back, legs, and shoulders, and increase grip strength. The basic movements, such as the swing, snatch, and the clean and jerk, engage the entire body at once, and in a way that mimics real world activities such as shoveling or farm work.

Unlike the exercises with dumbbells or barbells, kettlebell exercises involve large numbers of repetitions in the sport, and can also involve large reps in normal training. Kettlebell exercises are in their nature holistic; therefore they work several muscles simultaneously and may be repeated continuously for several minutes or with short breaks. This combination makes the exercise partially aerobic and more similar to high-intensity interval training rather than to traditional weight lifting. In a 2010 study, kettlebell enthusiasts performing a 20-minute snatch workout were measured to burn, on average, 13.6 calories/minute aerobically and 6.6 calories/minute anaerobically during the entire workout - "equivalent to running a 6-minute mile pace". When training with high repetitions, kettlebell progression should start out slowly to build muscle endurance, support the joints and prevent injury.

Like movements performed with any exercise tool, they can be dangerous to those who have back or shoulder problems, or a weak core, when performed without proper education and progression. However, if done properly, they are very beneficial to health. They can offer improved mobility, range of motion, agility, cardio vascular endurance, mental toughness and increased strength.

Exercises
The following is a list of common exercises that are uniquely suited to the kettlebell for one reason or another.

Using one kettlebell

American swing Also called the overhead swing, this swing variation ends with the kettlebell directly overhead instead of at chest level.
Turkish get-up A kettlebell exercise that combines the lunge, bridge and side plank in a slow, controlled movement. Keeping the arm holding the bell extended vertically, the athlete transitions from lying supine on the floor to standing, and back again. Get-ups are sometimes modified into get-up presses, with a press at each position of the get-up; that is, the athlete performs a floor press, a leaning seated press, a high bridge press, a single-leg kneeling press, and a standing press in the course of a single get-up.
Halo The kettlebell is held by the horns in front of the shoulders, usually upside-down, and moved in a circle around the head while keeping the head straight in place. This movement is done to improve mobility of the shoulders and triceps.
Arm bar As with the other slow exercises (the windmill, get-up, and halo), this drill improves shoulder mobility and stabilization. It starts lying on the ground with the kettlebell over the shoulder in a straight arm position, as in the top of a floor press, but with the other arm along the floor straight overhead. The trainee then gradually turns their body away from the kettlebell until they are lying partially on their front.
Slingshot The kettlebell is held hanging in one arm and moved smoothly around the body, switching hands in front and behind. In the figure-8 slingshot, the trainee moves the bell in a figure-8 through the legs while in a partial squat; a wider variation of this exercise is the cossack slingshot.
Slingshot lunge Also called a front leg pass, this is a backward lunge, circling the bell around the front leg, returning to the standing position, and repeating.
Circular swing Like the slingshot, but the bell is swung forward until the arms are parallel to the ground.
Figure-8 swing Like a 1-arm swing, but the bell goes down on one side of the body, switching hands and up through the legs, and then down the other side.
Circular clean Starting with the bell in the rack, the bell is pushed away to the side slightly, the swung down to the other side in front of the body, and reversed back up into the rack.
Deck squat The kettlebell is held in two hands by the ball instead of the handle. The trainee squats down deeply, then rocks back on their back and lowers the bell overhead so that the handle touches the ground, before reverse the movement and standing back up.
Helping hand press A variation of the press where the other arm assists by pushing open palm against the ball.
Isometric holds Stand on one leg and hold the kettle bell with the opposite arm. By then lowering and raising the kettlebell you can work stabilization and power.
Bent press A press utilizing a bent-leg windmill position to lift heavier weight than is otherwise possible.
Arm bar floor press A floor press in the arm bar or partial arm bar position.
Russian twist While seated the trainee leans back to around 45 degrees and balances with the knees held at 90 degrees from the torso. The bell is held by the horns and moved from side to side of the torso.

Using two kettlebells
The following movements can be done with two kettlebells:
Renegade row Also called a plank row, the trainee starts in the plank position holding the handles of two grounded kettlebells. One bell is rowed to the chest while maintaining the plank position, then returned to the ground and repeated with the other arm. Alternatively performed with a single kettlebell, one arm at a time.
Alternating clean Also known as gorilla cleans, a clean is performed with one arm while the other kettlebell is kept in the rack position, then repeated with the other arm.
Pushup Starting in the plank position holding the handles of two grounded kettlebells, the trainee performs a pushup. This requires more control than an ordinary pushup and results in a greater range of motion. This is often combined with the renegade row. Feet may be elevated to increase the difficulty, until the trainee is performing a handstand push-up on the kettlebells.
Carry Walking with two kettlebells held in various positions, such as waiter (one arm overhead, one arm rack, either hand or both with waiter hold) or cross (one arm overhead, one arm suitcase).

For some exercises, multiple kettlebells can be held in the same hand, for trainees lacking sufficiently heavy kettlebells. In any movement involving the rack or overhead position, the kettlebell can be held with the ball in an open palm (sometimes called the waiter hold) for a greater stabilisation challenge, or for even more precise control and added grip challenge, the bottom-up hold, squeezing the kettlebell by the handle upside-down. This is especially useful for training to stay tight while pressing. Holding a single kettlebell in the rack position bottom-up with two hands ("by the horns") makes for goblet exercise variants.

Using one or two kettlebells
Conventional swing The kettlebell is swung from just below the groin to somewhere between the upper abdomen and shoulders, with arms straight or slightly bent, the degree of flexion depends on the trajectory of the kettlebell. 
High pull A swing variation where the kettlebell is thrust a little higher than the Russian swing, and at the apex the bell is pulled in towards the shoulder, and then pushed out again and back down into the swing. Sometimes the "high pull" instead refers to a deadlift that continues into a pull straight up to shoulder level.
Hang clean The kettlebell is held in the rack position (resting on the forearm in the crook of the elbow, with the elbow against the chest), lowered to below the knees, and then thrust back up in to the rack. 
Swing clean The kettlebell is held in the rack position, dropped into the back-swing behind the knees, and then back up in to the rack via the up-swing. The clean is often combined with a press or jerk to make a clean and press or a clean & jerk (also called a long jerk). This is the most common clean, hence, it's referred to as 'clean' rather than 'swing clean'.
Dead clean The kettlebell is pulled up dead from the ground, straight into rack position.
Snatch There are two styles of snatch, Hardstyle Snatch and Kettlebell Sport Snatch. The kettlebell is held in one hand, lowered to behind the knees via hip hinge, swung to an overhead position and held stable, before repeating the movement. The dead snatch or true snatch begins with the bell on the ground. The lunge snatch lowers into a lunge while the bell goes to the overhead position.
Strict press Also called the military press or standing press, the kettlebell is held in the rack position and pushed overhead with one arm, keeping the body rigid. The tree press, a press standing on one leg, performs a similar function. Other variations include the walking press, taking a step forward with each press, perhaps alternating hands, and the seated press, where the trainee sits on the ground with straight legs while pressing overhead.
Floor press A press performed lying on the ground. A variation is the bridge press, a press in the wrestler's bridge position.
Push press As a strict press, but with a single dip of the hips to provide assistance.
Jerk As a push press, but with two dips, for more leg assistance (as in the barbell clean and jerk)
Thruster A rack squat with a press at the top using momentum from the squat.
Squat The basic squat is performed holding one or more kettlebells in the rack position, or a single a bell in the goblet position, which can help develop hip mobility by using the elbows to push the knees out at the bottom of the squat.
Overhead squat A squat with the kettlebell held overhead, requiring good hip and shoulder mobility.
Sots press Named after world record olympic weightlifter Viktor Sots, also called the squat press, this exercise is a rack squat with a press at the bottom of the squat.
Lunge press Sometimes called the tactical lunge, this is a press from a lunging position.
Pistol squat A single-leg squat with one leg held straight in front parallel to the ground, holding the bell in the goblet or rack position. An easier variant for those with less hip mobility is to perform the squat parallel to a step or ledge, so that the foot of the free leg can dip beneath the pushing leg at the bottom.
Deadlift Can be performed different styles, sumo, squat or hip hinge, with one or more kettlebells between the legs, it can also be performed with the kettlebells on the outside (suitcase). Deadlifts can also be performed with one-arm, one-leg, or both.
Carry Walking with the kettlebell held in various positions, such as suitcase, rack, goblet, or overhead.
Row While bent over anywhere from 45 degrees to parallel with the ground, the kettlebell is held hanging from a straight arm, pulled up to the hips or laterally, and lowered again.
Lunge A lunge performed with the kettlebell held in either the hanging, racked, overhead or mixed position.
Lateral lunge A lateral lunge with the bell in either the racked or overhead positions. The deepest form of this is called the cossack squat.
Lateral lunge clean A clean performed along with a lateral lunge.
Squat Get-up A variation of the Turkish get-up where the feet are pulled into the buttocks to get up squat style.
Windmill Standing with a bell held overhead, the hips are pushed to the side of the bell. Keeping the bell arm vertical, the upper body is bent to one side and rotated until the other hand is touching the floor. This improves mobility and stability through the hips and shoulder. Alternatively the bell may be held in the other hand, or with one in each hand. An easier version is the bent-leg windmill where the off-side leg is bent, or the supported windmill where the free hand rests against the off leg.
Farmer's Walk Walking holding kettlebells at your sides. The single kettlebell version is called the suitcase walk. These build grip strength while challenging your core, hips, back and traps.

Kettlebell swing 

The kettlebell swing (also the Russian swing, double-arm swing or conventional kettlebell swing) is a basic ballistic used to train the posterior chain in a manner similar to broad jumping. The kettlebell is swung from just below the groin to somewhere between the upper abdomen and shoulders, with arms straight or slightly bent, the degree of flexion depends on the trajectory of the kettlebell. The key to a good kettlebell swing is effectively thrusting the hips, not bending too much at the knees, and sending the weight forwards, as opposed to squatting the weight up, or lifting up with the arms.  Some knee flexion (a squat) is commonly employed during the swing, although there is some controversy
as to whether a swing can or should be performed with just a hip hinge instead.

This exercise requires an intense contraction of the gluteal, abdominal and latissimus muscles.

Variations 
The swing can also be performed with a release and catch of the kettlebell, which helps train the proper swing pattern where the arms aren't pulling up at the top. This can be done with two hands switching to a supinated catch. The one-arm swing presents a significant anti-twisting challenge, and can be used with an alternating catch switching between arms. 
Further variations include the walking swing taking a step forward at the apex of each swing, the outside swing where the kettlebell swings outside the leg, and the kneeling swing, swinging between the legs in a one-leg half-kneeling position.

There are many variations of the kettlebell swing, some are, but not limited to:
single-arm swing, one kettlebell double arm swing, two kettlebells double arm swing, suitcase swing, swing squat style, high swing.
Within those variations there are plenty more variations, some are, but not limited to:
pace, movement, speed, power, grip, the direction of thumb, elbow flexion, knee flexion.

Grips 
The kettlebell has more than 25 grips that can be employed, to provide variety, challenge different muscles, increase or decrease complexity, and work on proprioception. Some of the grip categories are, but not limited to: 
pressing grips, racking grips,  lifting grips, ballistic grips, juggling grips, isometric hold grips.

Lifting styles

Contemporary kettlebell training is represented basically by five styles.

Hardstyle has its roots in powerlifting and Gōjū-ryū karate training, particularly hojo undō concepts. With emphasis on the "hard" component and borrowing the concept of kime, the Hardstyle focuses on strength and power and duality of relaxation and tension.

Girevoy, sometimes referred to as the fluid style in comparison to the Hardstyle, represents the training regimen for the competitive sport of kettlebell lifting, focusing on strength endurance.

Crossfit kettlebell refers to implementation of kettlebell training as in CrossFit curricula, often with significant modifications to preceding styles (e.g. American Swing vs. conventional swing, placing the kettlebell down between snatches).

Juggling is a training style where the practitioner releases and catches the kettlebell with all manner of spins and flips around the body.

Kettlebell training is all that is done with a kettlebell outside of the above 4 categories. Kettlebell training is extremely broad and caters to many different goals, some being, but not limited to: mobility, flexibility, cardiovascular endurance, strength, speed and power. If an athlete is training in the gym, on the beach, or in the park, and not performing any of the above disciplines, they are participating in kettlebell training.

Kettlebell sport 

The kettlebell sport having originated in Russia now has competitions across the world, it consists of three main lifts: the snatch, jerk and the long cycle.

Competition colours 
Competition grade kettlebells used in kettlebell sport and lesuire lifting are colour coded by bell or horn to allow quick and easy recognition.

Weights that increment at 2kg such as; 10, 14, 18, 22, 26, 30, 34 are the same colour as the weight 2 kilograms below them but are notated by black bands on the handle in competitive lifting. For example, a 10 Kg bell is pink with black bands on the handle, and an 18 Kg bell is yellow with black bands on the handle.

See also

 Bulgarian Bag
 Exercise equipment
 Medicine ball
 Pool dumbbell
 Weight lifting belt
 Weights

References

External links
https://giri-iukl.com/
https://www.iklf.org/
https://wksf.site/

Weight training equipment
Russian inventions